The Frauen-Bundesliga 1998–99 was the 9th season of the Frauen-Bundesliga, Germany's premier football league. It began on 22 August 1998 and ended on 23 May 1999.

Final standings

Results

Top scorers

References

1998-99
Ger
1
Women